Crescent Point Energy Corp. is an oil and gas company based in Calgary, Alberta, Canada. The company focuses primarily on light oil production in southern Saskatchewan and central Alberta. Since inception in 2001, Crescent Point has significantly increased its production. The company was founded in 2001 and is one of the largest independent oil and gas producers in Canada and has a significant presence in the Western Canadian Sedimentary Basin. The company's operations also include assets in the Williston Basin in the United States. Crescent Point Energy is listed on the Toronto Stock Exchange and is a publicly traded company.

History
In 2001 Crescent Point Energy began trading on the TSX Venture Exchange as a junior exploration and production company. It joined the Toronto Stock Exchange the following year.  In 2003, it merged with Tappit Resources. As part of the merger, Crescent Point converted to an income trust.  In February 2007, it acquired Mission Oil and Gas for $628 million. From Mission, Crescent Point acquired a large position in the Viewfield Bakken oil field in the Williston Basin. Since 2007, Crescent Point has since expanded its Three Forks play both north and south of the border.  In 2009, Crescent converted back to a normal corporation (from an income trust).

In 2010, Crescent Point acquired properties in the Lower Shaunavon resource play in southwest Saskatchewan from Penn West Energy Trust. In return, it provided a number of properties in Alberta and Saskatchewan, as well as $434 million in cash. Crescent Point began trading on the New York Stock Exchange in 2014 under the same CPG symbol.

In May 2015, Crescent Point acquired Legacy Oil and Gas for $1.5 billion.

On 29 May 2018, Crescent Point announced that former President & CEO, Scott Saxberg, would be leaving the company after 17 years, with Craig Bryksa taking over duties as president and CEO on an interim basis. On 5 September 2018, Crescent Point confirmed Craig Bryksa as its new president and CEO. Robert (Bob) Heinemann also replaced Peter Bannister as chairman on Crescent Point's board of directors. Barbara Munroe was appointed as board chair following Bob Heinemann's retirement in October, 2019.

Assets and holdings
As of 2020, production was 121,000 boe/day. Crescent Point mainly produces light and medium oil, as opposed to heavy oil or natural gas. On 17 February 2021, Crescent Point announced strategic entry into the Kaybob Duvernay play by acquiring 30,000 boe/d of production for $900 million from Shell Canada Energy. Most of the company's oil production is from central Alberta, southern Saskatchewan and northern North Dakota; notable fields in these areas include the Kaybob Duvernay, Viewfield Bakken, Flat Lake, Shaunavon and Three Forks and Viking areas.

References

External links

Companies listed on the Toronto Stock Exchange
Companies listed on the New York Stock Exchange
Oil companies of Canada
Natural gas companies of Canada
Companies based in Calgary